PTV Balitaan was a flagship morning newscast broadcast on Philippine state television network PTV, which was aired from January 7, 2013 to August 29, 2014, replacing Metro One and with RadyoBisyon.  It is aired weekdays from 5:30 am to 7:00 am (UTC +8). Balitaan's format consisted of international, national and local news, sports, entertainment (the only PTV-produced newscast to do so) and special interviews.

History
Balitaan premiered in January 2013 as one of the replacements of the short-lived morning show Metro One. Metro One News segment anchor Audrey Gorriceta and former RPN NewsWatch reporters Vivienne Gulla and Pircelyn Pielago led the anchormen of the morning newscast. Dina Paguibitan, Sam Ramirez, Cheska Aguiluz, Julius Disamburun, Fred Monteza, and Jackie Say were the first reporters of the newscast.

Emil Carreon who has duties as the executive producer of the program joined the anchors in 2013 as the segment host of Editorial and Interviews segment. PTV ARMM Bureau Chief Bro. Hajji Munir Jannaral's program segment Salam started in January 2014 as part of the campaign on the peace process in the Bangsamoro region.

Pielago bid farewell as the anchor of Balitaan in April 2014 due to her commitments as one of the candidates of Miss Philippines Earth 2014 but returned as one of the reporters of the newscast. Gorriceta and Gulla retained as the anchors of the newscast.

On June 2, 2014, Balitaan reformatted with a brand new studio set designed by Extremity Arts, new graphics and new titlecards.

On August 29, 2014, Balitaan air their last broadcast to make way for RadyoBisyon.

Anchors
 Audrey Gorriceta
 Vivienne Gulla

Segment Hosts
 Harry Bayona, Amor Larrosa, Earle Figuracion, Jesy Basco, Aubrey Ner - Panahon.TV
 Marjolee Carpio - MMDA Traffic Report
 Emil Carreon - Editoryal
 Bro. Hajji Munir Jannaral - Salam: Daan tungo sa Kaunlaran at Kapayapaan
 Julius Disamburun

Former Anchors
 Pircelyn Pialago
 Benj Bondoc - MMDA Traffic Report
 Hajji Kaamiño - MMDA Traffic Report

See also
 List of programs aired by People's Television Network

Philippine television news shows
People's Television Network original programming
Filipino-language television shows
2013 Philippine television series debuts
2014 Philippine television series endings